Tylenchorhynchus zeae is a plant pathogenic nematode infecting pearl millet.

References

External links 
 Nemaplex, University of California - Tylenchorhynchus zeae

Agricultural pest nematodes
Pearl millet diseases
Tylenchida